Dr. Friedrich Karl Stephan (born 27 May 1941) is an American academic who is a circadian physiologist.  He is the Curt P. Richter Distinguished Professor of Psychology & Neuroscience at Florida State University.  His research focuses on localization and function of biological clocks in vertebrates, light and food as entraining signals for circadian rhythms, obesity, sleep, and reproduction. He is credited as the discoverer of the suprachiasmatic nucleus ("body clock").

External links
 Florida State University faculty profile

References

Florida State University faculty
1941 births
Living people
American neuroscientists